Steve "The King" Kinser (born June 2, 1954) is a former professional sprint car racing driver. He has won 20 championships in the World of Outlaws (WoO) series. Kinser left the World of Outlaws in 2006 to compete with the National Sprint Tour series, but returned to the World of Outlaws for the 2007 season. ESPN named him 25th on their top drivers of all-time in 2008. He was inducted into the Motorsports Hall of Fame of America in 2017.

Background
Kinser was a high school wrestler. He finished second in state as a junior, and was a state champion wrestler as a senior. Both of his sons also wrestled in high school. His youngest son Kurt, won the Indiana state tournament as a senior as well, capping off the  Bloomington High School South team's excellent season. Kurt wrestled at Indiana University, competing at the 149 and 157-pound weight classes, and later became a professional mixed martial artist. 

After Kinser's win on Saturday May 12, 2012 at the Williams Grove Speedway, Steve became the oldest driver ever to win a World of Outlaws main event at the age of 57, although this record would be broken in May of 2021 when Dave Blaney won the World Of Outlaws feature race at Sharon Speedway at age 58.

World of Outlaws career

He became a World of Outlaws driver in 1978. In 1987, he won 46 features, including 12 in a row, and 24 of the last 26 events. He has won the Knoxville Nationals a record 12 times, the Gold Cup Race of Champions 12 times, and the Kings Royal at Eldora 7 times.  He won twenty WoO championships and 690 "A" features (including full-field preliminary night wins). He was inducted in the National Sprint Car Hall of Fame in 2005. He has been described as the best sprint racer ever by both columnists and even his rivals. In August 2016, Kinser retired from Sprint Car racing.

Other racing accomplishments
In 1981, a 26-year-old rookie, Kinser failed to qualify for the Indianapolis 500 when his month was ended by a practice crash. He returned in 1997 driving a Dallara-Oldsmobile, where he qualified 20th and finished 14th after a late race accident in Turn 4. It was his only Indy Racing League start.

During his many tours of Australia racing Sprint cars, Kinser won many feature races and drew large crowds wherever he raced, but on January 4, 1986 he swapped his Sprinter for a VW-powered Midget (called a Speedcar in Australia) and won the 38th Australian Speedcar Grand Prix at Sydney's Liverpool City Raceway. Kinser began touring Australia in 1979, before returning many times during the 1980s and 1990s, generally teaming with his brother Randy in Gambler chassis Sprint cars distinctively sponsored by cigarette companies, including the black and gold of JPS, and the sky blue and white Commodore brand. In 1985/86, Steve Kinser headlined a four driver tour of Australia which included his brother Randy and cousins Mark and Kelly. The JPS sponsored Kinser's virtually cleaned-up on their 1985/86 Australian tour, winning races at the major speedways in the country against Australia's best drivers including multiple Australian Champions Garry Rush, George Tatnell and Max Dumesny.

Kinser has been selected several times to compete in the International Race of Champions, winning a race at Talladega Superspeedway in 1994. That year he also finished a career best 6th in IROC points.

In 1995 Kinser landed a NASCAR Winston Cup Series ride as drag racing legend Kenny Bernstein hired Kinser to drive his No. 26 Quaker State Ford, but after the first 7 races of 1995, Kinser was released and replaced by Hut Stricklin after posting no wins and no top tens with an average finish of 35.2 and a best finish of 27th at Rockingham along with 3 DNF's and 2 DNQ's.

Family
His family is also involved in racing, as his younger brother Randy Kinser and cousins Kelly Kinser and Mark Kinser, who was also a championship winning driver on the World of Outlaws circuit. His son Kraig Kinser races for Steve Kinser Racing in the number 11k World of Outlaws sprint car. Kraig won the 2005 Knoxville Nationals. He has two other children, Stevie and Kurt. His second cousin, once removed Sheldon Kinser competed in the CART series and raced in the Indianapolis 500 six times. Steve is the son of Bob Kinser.

Steve's third cousin Karl Kinser (Mark Kinser's father) was Steve's car owner 1978 to 1994, and was crew chief for Steve and Randy's cars on their frequent tours to Australia in the 1980s. Karl has been the winning car owner and mechanic for 16 World of Outlaws championships and 12 Knoxville Nationals wins. Karl was inducted in the National Sprint Car Hall of Fame. Even though Karl is his third cousin, Steve Kinser often joked to reporters that the pair weren't really related.

Motorsports career results

World of Outlaws
 1978: Champion  – 11 wins.
 1979: Champion  – 23 wins.
 1980: Champion  – 28 wins.
 1981: 3rd in points  – 23 wins.
 1982: 2nd in points  – 13 wins.
 1983: Champion  – 18 wins.
 1984: Champion  – 19 wins.
 1985: Champion  – 15 wins.
 1986: Champion – 18 wins.
 1987: Champion  – 46 wins.
 1988: Champion  – 27 wins.
 1990: Champion  – 27 wins.
 1991: Champion – 36 wins.
 1992: Champion  – 31 wins.
 1993: Champion  – 19 wins.
 1994: Champion  – 29 wins.
 1995: 9th in points  – 18 wins.
 1996: 4th in points  – 10 wins.
 1997: 3rd in points  – 5 wins.
 1998: Champion  – 6 wins.
 1999: 3rd in points  – 11 wins.
 2000: Champion  – 10 wins.
 2001: 3rd in points  – 6 wins.
 2002: Champion  – 20 wins.
 2003: Champion  – 25 wins.
 2004: Champion 17 wins.
 2005: Champion  – 20 wins.
 2006: 2nd in points (NST)  – 5 wins.
 2007: 6th in points  – 10 wins.
 2008: 3rd in points  – 7 wins.
 2009: 4th in points  – 2 wins.
 2010: 3rd in points  – 9 wins.
 2011: 3rd in points  – 9 wins.
 2012: 5th in points  – 4 wins.
 2013: 8th in points  – 2 wins. 
 2014: 8th in points   – 1 win. "Last fulltime season"
 2015: 19th in points - 0 wins.

NASCAR
(key) (Bold – Pole position awarded by qualifying time. Italics – Pole position earned by points standings or practice time. * – Most laps led.)

Winston Cup Series

American open-wheel racing results 
(key) (Races in bold indicate pole position) (Races in italics indicate fastest lap)

Indy Racing League

Indianapolis 500

References

External links

Official website

Biography at stevekinser.com
Indiana State resolution honoring Kinser

1954 births
NASCAR drivers
Indianapolis 500 drivers
International Race of Champions drivers
IndyCar Series drivers
Living people
National Sprint Car Hall of Fame inductees
Sportspeople from Bloomington, Indiana
Racing drivers from Indiana
USAC Silver Crown Series drivers
World of Outlaws drivers